Trapped in Tia Juana is a 1932 American pre-Code Western film directed by Wallace Fox. Duncan Renaldo plays twin brothers separated at birth: West Point graduate Kenneth Holbert and Mexican bandit El Zorro.

Cast
Edwina Booth as Dorothy
Duncan Renaldo as Kenneth Holbert/El Zorro

References

External links
 
 
 
 

1932 films
1932 Western (genre) films
1930s American films
1930s English-language films
American black-and-white films
American Western (genre) films
Films about twin brothers
Films directed by Wallace Fox
Mayfair Pictures films